The turbo shrew (Crocidura turba) is a species of mammal in the family Soricidae. It is found in Angola, Burundi, Cameroon, Central African Republic, Republic of the Congo, Democratic Republic of the Congo, Equatorial Guinea, Gabon, Kenya, Malawi, Rwanda, South Sudan, Tanzania, Uganda, and Zambia. Its natural habitats are subtropical or tropical moist lowland and montane forests.

References

Crocidura
Mammals described in 1910
Taxonomy articles created by Polbot